</ref>

Taxonomy
Grevillea pityophylla was first formally described in 1868 by Ferdinand von Mueller in Fragmenta Phytographiae Australiae from specimens collected by James Drummond. The specific epithet (pityophylla) means "pine tree-leaved".

Distribution and habitat
This grevillea grows in open shrubland on granite outcrops, breakaways andsandplains in between Mullewa, Mount Magnet and Wanarra Station in the Avon Wheatbelt, Murchison and Yalgoo bioregions of inland Western Australia.

See also
 List of Grevillea species

References

pityophylla
Endemic flora of Western Australia
Eudicots of Western Australia
Proteales of Australia
Taxa named by Ferdinand von Mueller
Plants described in 1868